Crni ples (trans. Black Dance) is the third and last studio album by the Serbian and former Yugoslav rock band Oktobar 1864, released in 1990.

Track listing

Personnel 
 Tanja Jovićević - vocals
 Goran Tomanović - guitar
 Dejan Abadić - keyboards
 Ljuba Tomanović - bass
 Ivan Zečević - drums
 Slobodan Andrić - saxophone
 Vuk Dinić - trombone
 Branko Baćović - trumpet
 Dragan Kozarčić - trumpet
 Orhan Begovski - percussion

Guests
 Milan Mladenović - backing vocalist
 Anton Horvat - saxophone
 Deže Molnar - saxophone

References

External links

Oktobar 1864 albums
1990 albums
PGP-RTB albums
Serbian-language albums